Suffer may refer to suffering. 

Suffer may also refer to:

Music
 Suffer (album), by Bad Religion
 "Suffer", a song by Grace Jones from her album Muse
 "Suffer", a song by Staind from their album Break The Cycle
 "Suffer", a song by Stone Sour from Come What(ever) May
 "Suffer", a song by Suicide Silence from their album No Time to Bleed
 "Suffer", a song by The Smashing Pumpkins from their album Gish
 "Suffer", a song by The Smith Street Band from their album More Scared of You Than You Are of Me

Other uses
 Allow, a synonym for suffer, as in, "Suffer the children to come unto me"
 Endurance, sufferance

See also
Suffrage
 The Suffering (disambiguation)